High anxiety is a non-technical term referring to a state of extreme fear or apprehension. It may also mean:

 High Anxiety, a 1977 film by Mel Brooks
 High Anxiety (Therapy? album), 2003
 High Anxiety (Thom Sonny Green album), 2016
 High Anxiety, a 2014 album by Pet Lamb (recorded in 1995)
 "High Anxiety", a song on the A Match and Some Gasoline album by The Suicide Machines
 "High Anxiety", a song from Sugar Ray's album Floored
 "High Anxiety" (Part 2), a King of the Hill episode
 "High Anxiety", an episode of Kate & Allie
 "High Anxiety", The Golden Girls episode
 "High Anxiety", a Dawson's Creek episode
 "High Anxiety", an episode from 7th Heaven
 "High Anxiety", an episode of A Different World
 "High Anxiety", an episode of Full House
 "Episode 3: High Anxiety", an episode from Rayman: The Animated Series
 "High Anxiety", an episode from Rescue Heroes (originally named Terror In The Tower, but retitled after the September 11 attack, then got banned from Teletoon shortly after)

See also
 Anxiety (mood)
 Anxiety disorder
 Panic attack
 Fight-or-flight response